Rain is a Ugandan 2016 drama film directed by Daniel Mugerwa, written by Mary Nyanzi and produced by Eleanor and Mathew Nabwiso. The film was released on 20 August 2016 in Kampala and stars Eleanor Nabwiso, Mathew Nabwiso, Joel Okuyo Atiku, Phillip Luswata and Joanita Bewulira. The film received numerous awards in Uganda and abroad and won Best Women’s Rights Film award at the London Eye International Festival, organised and run by London Film Network Ltd at the Terbanacle Theater in London, Best Actress in East African and Best First time Director from FESTICAB a film festival in Burundi,  Best Film in Africa and Middle East award from NUREN film festival in China and Best Screenplay at Uganda Film Festival Awards in Uganda.

Summary
Rain is a young girl who comes from Masaka to Kampala in the hopes of becoming a shining music star. Her dream is soon shuttered when someone in the music industry makes her pregnant and infects her with HIV.

Production
Rain was Eleanor and Mathew Nabwio’s first production after they acted together on The Hostel, where they started their relationship and got married. They had started a new production company called Nabwiso Films, and Rain was the first project produced under their company. The film was also co-produced in association with Crane Media Productions, Heights Montage, Qeyrem Motion Pictures.

Awards and nominations

References

External links
 Rain Trailer (on Youtube)
 

Films set in Uganda
Films shot in Uganda
English-language Ugandan films
2016 films
2010s English-language films